Gregory A. Petsko (born August 7, 1948) is an American biochemist and member of the National Academy of Sciences, the National Academy of Medicine,  the American Academy of Arts and Sciences, and the American Philosophical Society. He is currently Professor of Neurology at the Ann Romney Center for Neurologic Diseases at Harvard Medical School and Brigham and Women's Hospital. He formerly had an endowed professorship (the Arthur J. Mahon Chair) in Neurology and Neuroscience at Weill Cornell Medical College and is still an adjunct professor of Biomedical Engineering at Cornell University, and is also the Gyula and Katica Tauber Professor, Emeritus, in biochemistry and chemistry at Brandeis University.

As of 2020 Petsko's research interests are understanding the biochemical bases of neurological diseases like Alzheimer's, Parkinson's, and ALS, discovering drugs (especially by using structure-based drug design) and biologics, especially gene therapy, that could therapeutically affect those biochemical targets, and seeing any resulting clinical candidates tested in humans.  He has made key contributions to the fields of protein crystallography, biochemistry, biophysics, enzymology, and neuroscience.

Education

Petsko was an undergraduate at Princeton University, where he graduated summa cum laude in 1970. He received a Rhodes Scholarship, and obtained his doctorate in Molecular Biophysics from Merton College, Oxford supervised by David Phillips, studying the structure and mechanism of  the enzyme triosephosphate isomerase.

He did a brief postdoctoral fellowship in Paris with Pierre Douzou, studying enzymology at low temperatures. In 1995 he did a sabbatical at the University of California at San Francisco with Ira Herskowitz, where he learned yeast genetics and molecular biology.

Career
Petsko's independent academic career has included stints at Wayne State University School of Medicine, the Massachusetts Institute of Technology, the Max Planck Institute for Medical Research in Heidelberg, and, from 1991 until 2012, Brandeis University, where he was Professor of Biochemistry and of Chemistry and director of the Rosenstiel Basic Medical Sciences Research Center.  He is past-president of the American Society for Biochemistry and Molecular Biology and of the International Union for Biochemistry and Molecular Biology. He is an elected member of the National Academy of Sciences, the National Academy of Medicine, and the American Academy of Arts and Sciences. He is a foreign member of the Hungarian Academy of Sciences and has an honorary Doctor of Laws from Dalhousie University. In April 2010, he was elected to the American Philosophical Society.  In 2012, he announced that he was moving to Weill Cornell Medical College in New York City, where his wife, Dr. Laurie Glimcher, had been appointed dean.  He was appointed at Weill Cornell Medical College as the director of the Helen and Robert Appel Alzheimer's Disease Research Institute and the Arthur J. Mahon Professor of Neurology and Neuroscience in the Feil Family Brain and Mind Research Institute, and at Cornell University as adjunct professor of Biomedical Engineering, and retained an appointment at Brandeis University as Gyula and Katica Tauber Professor of Biochemistry and Chemistry, Emeritus. His wife was named president and CEO of the Dana–Farber Cancer Institute in October 2016, and in January 2019 he followed her back to Boston, assuming his present position as Professor of Neurology at the Ann Romney Center for Neurologic Diseases at Brigham and Women's Hospital and Harvard Medical School.

Research
Petsko's current research interests are understanding the biochemical bases of neurological diseases like Alzheimer's, Parkinson's, and ALS, discovering drugs (especially by using structure-based drug design) that could therapeutically affect those biochemical targets, and seeing any resulting drug and gene therapy candidates tested in humans.

Petsko's past research interests have been in protein crystallography and enzymology. He is co-author with Dagmar Ringe of Protein Structure and Function. He was also the author of a monthly column in Genome Biology modelled after an amusing column in Current Biology penned by Sydney Brenner. Petsko is best known for his collaborative work with Dagmar Ringe, in which they used X-ray crystallography to solve important problems in protein function including protein dynamics as a function of temperature and problems in mechanistic enzymology.

At MIT and Brandeis, he and Dagmar Ringe trained a large number of current leaders in structural molecular biology who now have leadership roles in science.  These individuals include:
 Tom Alber and John Kuriyan, professors at University of California, Berkeley (Kuriyan is a member of the National Academy of Sciences)
 Barry Stoddard and Roland Strong, faculty at Fred Hutchinson Cancer Research Center
 Ilme Schlichting, department head at Max Planck Institute for Medical Research
 Ann Stock, professor at the Howard Hughes Medical Institute and Rutgers
 Steven Almo, professor and chair of biochemistry at Albert Einstein College of Medicine
 Axel Brunger, professor at Stanford University and member of the National Academy of Sciences
 Elias Lolis, professor at Yale University
 Dennis Vitkup, professor at Columbia University
 Charles Brenner, department head at University of Iowa
 Karen Allen, professor and chair of chemistry at Boston University
 Lynne Howell, professor at University of Toronto
 David Rose, professor at University of Waterloo
 and Stephen Burley formerly of SGX Pharmaceuticals and now head of the Protein Data Bank

References

Princeton University alumni
American Rhodes Scholars
Brandeis University faculty
Living people
1948 births
Members of the United States National Academy of Sciences
Members of the American Philosophical Society
Members of the National Academy of Medicine
Presidents of the International Union of Biochemistry and Molecular Biology